Anadolu Üniversitesi Sport Hall is an indoor multi-purpose sport venue that is located in the Anadolu University 2 Eylül Campus, Eskişehir, Turkey. The hall, with a capacity for 5,000 spectators, was built in 2011. It is home to Eskişehir Basket, which plays currently in the Turkish Basketball League.

References

Sports venues completed in 2011
Indoor arenas in Turkey
Basketball venues in Turkey
2011 establishments in Turkey